Mankovce is a village and municipality in Zlaté Moravce District of the Nitra Region, in western-central Slovakia.

History
In historical records the village was first mentioned in 1345. The name of the city in Hungarian is Mankóc, earlier Mankócz ("Great auk", Pinguinus impennis).

Geography
The municipality lies at an altitude of 300 metres and covers an area of 4.238 km². It has a population of about 540 people.

References

External links
http://www.e-obce.sk/obec/mankovce/mankovce.html

Villages and municipalities in Zlaté Moravce District